Wadanthika was the second Queen of the Central Palace of King Sithu II of the Pagan Dynasty of Myanmar (Burma). She may also have been Sithu II's chief queen for a brief period.

Chronicles do not identify her by her personal name; they identify her simply as younger sister of Thubarit, and mother of Yazathu, Pyanchi and Gingathu. But contemporary inscriptional evidence shows that the name of the queen of Sithu II and the mother of Yazathu, Pyanchi and Gingathu was Wadanthika. According to the chronicle Yazawin Thit, she was Ale Pyinthe or Queen of the Central Palace, and was a grandniece of Queen Yadanabon I of Pagan. Inscriptional evidence as well as Maha Yazawin and Hmannan Yazawin chronicles say that she had the title Usaukpan, which according to Than Tun meant the chief queen. If so, Sithu II may have continued to keep the offices of the chief queen and the Queen of the Southern Palace separate. (His first chief queen Weluwaddy, and the first South Queen was Min Aung Myat.)

Wadanthika died soon after the birth of her third child.

Notes

References

Bibliography
 
 
 
 

Queens consort of Pagan
12th-century Burmese women